Peyədərə (also, Paya Dara, Peyadere, and Peyaderesi) is a village in the Goygol Rayon of Azerbaijan.

References 

Populated places in Goygol District